Mario Elbano Masciulli Manelli, Baron Miglianico (Livorno, Italy September 15, 1909 – Caracas, Venezuela October 16, 1991) was a prominent military engineer of the Italian Regia Marina, Major of Genio Navale and belonging to the recognized Decima Flottiglia MAS as director of the Office of Submarine Secret Weapons during Second World War.  He was awarded the Silver Medal of Military Valor.

Biography

First Years, Military Career

Masciulli joined the Livorno Naval Academy in 1925, being number one in the entrance exam, among a large group of students. Later he was sent to the Polytechnic of Turin, where he earned an honors degree in Industrial Engineering, before obtaining a PhD in Mechanical Engineering.

World War II

At the start of the war in 1939, he was conducting technical studies aboard various naval vessels such as the Battleship Andrea Doria and the Submarine Scirè where he familiarized with Prince Junio Valerio Borghese, by then commander of the submarine, who already knew of his years at the Academy.

In 1940, Borghese requested him to form part of the newly restructured Decima Flottiglia MAS. Along with captain Travaglini, step hold Office of Submarine Secret Weapons, where, after several losses and failed attacks on the British base in Malta, he made improvements to the first human torpedoes, originally designed by Teseo Tesei and known as Siluro a lenta Corsa (SLC) and nicknamed "Maiale" (Pig, in English), eliminating the cause of many problems. Using the experience gained and scientific, industrial, and technological progress, he began the construction of a similar design, but with significantly higher characteristics. Launched from the submarine Scire, two men maneuvered it from a cockpit. Once near the boat, they placed the explosives with a timer.
As director of the Office of Submarine Secret Weapons, he also designed and updated the Motoscafo Armato Silurante (MAS), motorboats of between 20 and 30 tons displacement, with a crew of 10 men armed with two torpedoes, plus several machine guns and occasionally a small-caliber cannon.

The biggest success of the Maiale occurred on December 19, 1941, when Lieutenant Luigi Durand de la Penne and Emilio Bianchi used two maiale to defend the port of Alexandria, Egypt, and severely damaged two British battleships ( and )
Other weapons were designed and built by the Office of Submarine Secret Weapons: these included acoustic mines and incendiary bombs which were designed so that the pilots of the torpedoes could introduce them into enemy ports.

Siluro San Bartolomeo
When using the Maiale Human Torpedo, Masciulli noticed some limitations, demonstrating the need for an updated version. The improvement in the materials available for the assembly and parallel new technologies led to a far superior product to the point of not being able to identify and as an outgrowth of the "Siluro a Lenta Corsa" SLC Maiale. So the Siluro San Bartolomeo had born. The project was managed and developed by the engineer of the Genio Navale, Major Mario Masciulli, with the help of Captain G.N Travaglino,  with help from engineer Guido Cattaneo. Also helping with the direction of Submarine Weapons Arsenal, La Spezia.

Armistice, September 8, 1943
The new Badoglio government of Italy signed an armistice with the Allies.  Further attacks on Gibraltar using the new and larger replacement for the SLC (the Siluro San Bartolomeo type), and a planned raid on New York City were called off due to the Italian surrender.
Just three Siluro San Bartolomeo had been manufactured for the date of the Armistice between Italy and Allied armed forces, two remained in La Spezia and one was sent to Venice, which was found at the end of the war. Both of La Spezia were consigned to the La Castagna Task Force, an old battery of the Decima Flottiglia MAS under the command of Lieutenant Augusto Jacobacci (Siluro San Bartolomeo pilot). Those had been designated to attack Gibraltar, but the action was suspended with the Armistice signed on 3 September 1943 but made public on 8 September, between the Kingdom of Italy and the Allies armed forces.

After War
The engineer Mario Masciulli was injured in a leg and both hands, for a technical accident in 1943, while he was doing a personal test aboard a Maiale. After the war he was promoted to the rank of colonel, always maintained close contact with Borghese.
Later plays for several years as director of the important company " Pirelli ", based in Milan. The company had already demonstrated their competence and high capacity when the engineer, as head of the Office of Submarine Secret Weapons, asking them material for the preparation of the costumes used by the "Frogmen".
In 1957 known in Milano, Italy, the Vice Admiral Carlos Larrazabal, Venezuelan Military attache in Italy and brother of the next President Wolfgang Larrazabal. He then asked for his vast knowledge, to teach at the Naval Academy and decided to move and settle in Caracas.

The rest of his life he worked as an entrepreneur in Venezuela along with several Italians who had also belonged to the Regia Marina.

He died in Caracas, of natural causes on October 16, 1991, in peace.

For the 1953 Italian war film  Siluri umani (internationally released as Human Torpedoes)  directed by Antonio Leonviola.  narrated the adventures of this secret weapons. One of its military advisors was Masciulli and the former admiral Marcantonio Bragadin. Leonviola came into conflict with the film's producers just before its completion and was replaced by Carlo Lizzani.

See also
Regia Marina
Siluro San Bartolomeo
Human torpedo
Decima Flottiglia MAS
MAS (boat)

External links
La Decima MAS 
Comando Supremo: Italy at War - Italian naval assault units: Decima Flottiglia MAS 
Associazione Combattenti X Flottiglia MAS
Siluro a Lenta Corsa

Bibliography
 
 
 
 Schofield, William. Frogmen First Battles. New York, 2000

References

1909 births
1991 deaths
20th-century Italian inventors
People from Livorno
Regia Marina personnel of World War II
Death in Caracas